Sonja Maria Barend (born 29 February 1940) is a Dutch television personality and former talk show host. Her talk show Sonja, which she presented since the 1970s, was noted for breaking taboos and allowing ordinary people a voice in public dialog. She retired from television in 2006, after four decades of television making.

Barend has worked for television since 1966. From the late 1970s on she presented her own weekly talk show for the (socialist) VARA broadcasting organization, a show whose name was based on the day of transmission, e.g. Sonja op Maandag ("Sonja on Monday"). In 1996 Sonja op Zaterdag ("Saturday") came to an end, after the retirement of Ellen Blazer, her regular producer, with whom she collaborated from the beginning of her television career. Her show, which featured interview and public discussion, was known for allowing ordinary people to have their say. This included, for instance, the viewpoints of ethnic minorities, and relied to a great extent on Barend's personality and commitment.

Barend was outspoken on political and ideological topics, and television viewers either loved or hated her. Especially in the 1970s and 1980s she was never afraid to openly discuss taboo topics—homosexuality, feminism, emancipation, and sexuality. According to Marcel van Dam, chairman of the VARA from 1985 on to 1995, she personified the public's negative perception of the VARA (ill-tempered, moralistic), but he could not imagine how the VARA would have survived without her.

From 1997 until 2002 she and Paul Witteman had a daily news and talk program, B&W. She officially retired from making television in 2006, and on the occasion of her last Sonja show, was awarded as Officer of the Order of Orange-Nassau by Job Cohen, then-mayor of Amsterdam. That last episode, which included an overview of her career and a number of notable television personalities, received a subtitle, "En morgen gezond weer op!" ("And tomorrow, wake up healthy"), in reference to her usual closing of her TV shows. Gezond Weer Op is also the title of a collection of interviews culled from her shows. An annual award for best television interview is named after her.

References
Notes

Bibliography

External links

Sonja Barend's biography, VARA

1940 births
Living people
Dutch television presenters
Dutch women television presenters
Dutch television talk show hosts
Officers of the Order of Orange-Nassau
Mass media people from Amsterdam